This is a list of winners of the Karnataka State's Dr. Rajkumar Award. Rajkumar was one of Kannada cinema's most successful actors. In his memory and honor, this award is presented annually during the Karnataka State Awards function.

Recipients

See also
 Karnataka State Film Awards
 Karnataka State Film Award for Best Film

References

Karnataka State Film Awards
1993 establishments in Karnataka